Touch of Sin may refer to:

Touch of Sin (album), 1985 album by  German heavy metal band Sinner
Touch of Sin 2, 2013 album by  German heavy metal band Sinner
A Touch of Sin, 2013 Chinese crime film